The Monetary Policy Council, Polish: Rada Polityki Pieniężnej (RPP), is a body of Narodowy Bank Polski, the central bank of Poland.

Each year, in parallel with the budget project presented by the government, the MPC sets the bases of monetary policy. It sets the level of the NBP's interest rates, the rules and levels of bank's reserve obligations, sets an upper limit on obligations resulting from loans taken by the NBP in foreign banking and financial institutions.

The MPC is made up of: Council Leader, who is the President of the NBP, and nine other members, selected in equal parts by the President of Poland, the Sejm and the Senate. Members of the MPC are chosen to serve for six-year terms.

Members of MPC

1998 - 2004 
 Hanna Gronkiewicz-Waltz (until 2000) - President of NBP - Chairman of the MPC
 Leszek Balcerowicz (since 2001) - President of NBP - Chairman of the MPC
 Marek Dąbrowski
 Bogusław Grabowski
 Cezary Józefiak
 Janusz Krzyżewski (deceased 2003)
 Wojciech Łączkowski
 Jerzy Pruski
 Dariusz Rosati
 Grzegorz Wójtowicz
 Wiesława Ziółkowska
 Jan Czekaj (since 2003)

2004 - 2010 
 Leszek Balcerowicz (until January 10, 2007) - President of NBP - Chairman of the MPC
 Sławomir Skrzypek (since January 10, 2007) - President of NBP - Chairman of the MPC
 Jan Czekaj
 Dariusz Filar
 Stanisław Nieckarz
 Marian Noga
 Stanisław Owsiak
 Mirosław Pietrewicz
 Andrzej Sławiński
 Halina Wasilewska-Trenkner
 Andrzej Wojtyna

2010 - 2016 
 Marek Belka - Chairman of the MPC
 Andrzej Bratkowski
 Elżbieta Chojna-Duch
 Zyta Gilowska
 Adam Glapiński
 Jerzy Hausner
 Andrzej Kaźmierczak
 Andrzej Rzońca
 Jan Winiecki
 Anna Zielińska-Głębocka

2016 - 2022 
 Adam Glapiński - Chairman of the MPC
 Grażyna Ancyparowicz
 Eugeniusz Gatnar
 Łukasz Hardt
 Cezary Kochalski - since December 21, 2019
 Jerzy Kropiwnicki
 Eryk Łon
 Rafał Sura - since November 16, 2016
 Kamil Zubelewicz
 Jerzy Żyżyński
 Jerzy Osiatyński - until December 20, 2019 
 Marek Chrzanowski - until October 6, 2016

References 

Government agencies of Poland
Finance in Poland
Monetary policy
Government finances in Poland